The George Taylor House in Corvallis, Oregon was built in 1900.  It is also known as Oliver House.  It was listed on the U.S. National Register of Historic Places in 1981.

According to the City of Corvallis, the address is 504 NW 6th Street, and it was built in 1900 not in 1896 as was reported in a previous application document.

References

Houses on the National Register of Historic Places in Oregon
Houses completed in 1900
Houses in Corvallis, Oregon
National Register of Historic Places in Benton County, Oregon
1896 establishments in Oregon